Muscarella quinqueseta is a species of orchid plant native to Costa Rica.

References 

Pleurothallidinae
Flora of Costa Rica